Buhay OFW was a weekly public service program catered for Overseas Filipino Workers or OFWs based in different countries outside the Philippines. The program also featured government and non-government organizations who are charged with taking care of the concerns of OFWs such as labor and recruitment issues. Buhay OFW also highlighted untold and successful stories of OFWs who survived from adversities and sufferings while working outside the country but have also given inspiration to their fellow Kababayans. The program also successfully organized several projects for the OFW community such as the Mr. and Ms. Citizens of the World, which was launched In 2012, in time for the program's 1st anniversary.

The program was premiered on September 10, 2011 as the blocktime program of AksyonTV (5 Plus since 2019) every Saturday evening from 9-10 pm (PST). It is also aired worldwide via AksyonTV International. The program was hosted by Marissa del Mar, a one-time PMPC Star Awards Best Public Service Program Host awardee and former host of Up Close and Personal on IBC-13, which was awarded as the Best Public Service Program, also from the PMPC Star Awards. Buhay OFW is produced by Millicent Productions, del Mar's own production house.

In October 2016, Buhay OFW was awarded as the Best Public Service Program, together with Mission: Possible of ABS-CBN, in the recently concluded 30th PMPC Star Awards for Television.

On July 27, 2019, Buhay OFW moved to GMA News TV with a new title World Class Kababayan with the program embodied all the viewers should know about.

References

External links
Official Website
Official Youtube channel

AksyonTV original programming
Philippine documentary television series
News5 shows
2011 Philippine television series debuts
2019 Philippine television series endings